Milica Zelda Tinska (Serbian Cyrillic: Милица Зелда Тинска, born 1978)  is a Serbian actress who lives and works in London, UK.

Career
Zelda trained as a ballerina in the renowned École supérieure de danse de Cannes Rosella Hightower, France, and later at the London Studio Centre, a college for performing arts in London, UK. 

She was a professional jazz, ballet and neoclassical dancer prior to becoming an actress, after being cast as Sonja in The Beach opposite Leonardo DiCaprio. As an actress, she appeared in the Waking The Dead, The Bill, The Beach, The Mother, Mathilde and many other productions, and has performed in English, French, Serbian, Croatian, Bosnian, Russian and Albanian.

In 2009, Tinska signed a petition in support of film director Roman Polanski, calling for his release after Polanski was arrested in Switzerland in relation to his 1977 sexual abuse case.

Tinska was part of the visual effects team of the film Ex Machina who received an Oscar for Best Achievement in Visual Effects.
When not acting, Zelda works as a VFX Producer.

Early life
Tinska is the daughter of famous Serbian actress, talk show host and writer Jelena Tinska and Dragoslav Lutovac, a film and television director.

Filmography

References

External links
 
 

1975 births
20th-century Serbian actresses
21st-century Serbian actresses
Living people
Actresses from Belgrade
Serbian emigrants to the United Kingdom
Serbian film actresses
Serbian stage actresses
Serbian television actresses
Visual effects artists
Visual effects supervisors